is a Japanese footballer who currently plays for Shan United.

Career statistics

Club

Notes

References

1989 births
Living people
Japanese footballers
Japanese expatriate footballers
Association football midfielders
Shan United F.C. players
Expatriate footballers in Mongolia
Expatriate footballers in Myanmar
Japanese expatriate sportspeople in Myanmar